Shaekagale Shanicece "Tami" Williams is a Jamaican-born high fashion model based in New York.

Career 
Williams was discovered at age 11. She was discovered by Deiwght Peters, CEO of Jamaican-based agency, Saint International Jamaica Limited. She has appeared in advertisements for Valentino, Dolce & Gabbana, Calvin Klein, Topshop, Balmain, and Gucci. She debuted as a semi-exclusive for Alexander Wang. She has walked the runway for Chanel, Marc Jacobs, Alberta Ferretti, Gucci, Valentino, Maison Margiela, Calvin Klein, Balmain, Lanvin, Emilio Pucci, Roberto Cavalli, Hermès, and Dolce & Gabbana.

Williams was once ranked as a "Top 50" model by models.com

Personal life 
Williams was born in St. Elizabeth, Jamaica and was raised by her mother, Carlene McLeod, a single mother who had five children. she originally attended Black River High and lived in Gazeland, St Elizabeth.

References 

Living people
Jamaican female models
The Society Management models
1998 births